The Malaysian Agricultural Research and Development Institute (Malay: Institut Penyelidikan dan Kemajuan Pertanian Malaysia), abbreviated MARDI, is a government body in Malaysia under Ministry of Agriculture and Agro-based Industry (MOA).

Malaysia Agro Exposition Park Serdang (MAEPS)

External links
MARDI official website

Federal ministries, departments and agencies of Malaysia
Ministry of Agriculture and Food Industries (Malaysia)
1969 establishments in Malaysia
Government agencies established in 1969
Agricultural organisations based in Malaysia
Agricultural research institutes
Research institutes in Malaysia